Edgefield County is a county located on the western border of the U.S. state of South Carolina. As of the 2020 census, its population was 25,657. Its county seat and largest municipality is Edgefield. The county was established on March 12, 1785.

The Savannah River makes up part of the western border of Edgefield County; across the river lies the city of Augusta, Georgia. Edgefield is part of the Augusta-Richmond County, GA-SC Metropolitan Statistical Area.

History 

The origin of the name Edgefield is unclear; the South Carolina State Library's information on the county's history suggests that the name "is usually described as 'fanciful.'" There is a village named Edgefield in Norfolk, England.

Edgefield District was created in 1785, and it is bordered on the west by the Savannah River.  It was formed from the southern section of the former Ninety-Six District when it was divided into smaller districts or counties by an act of the state legislature.  Parts of the district were later used in the formation of other neighboring counties, specifically:

 Aiken in 1871;
 Saluda in 1895;
 Greenwood in 1897;
 and, McCormick in 1916.

In his study of Edgefield County, South Carolina, Orville Vernon Burton classified white society as comprising the poor, the yeoman middle class, and the elite planters. A clear line demarcated the elite, but according to Burton, the line between poor and yeoman was never very distinct. Stephanie McCurry argues that yeomen were clearly distinguished from poor whites by their ownership of land (real property). Edgefield's yeomen farmers were "self-working farmers," distinct from the elite because they worked their land themselves alongside any slaves they owned. By owning large numbers of slaves, planters took on a managerial function and did not work in the fields.

During Reconstruction, Edgefield County had a slight black majority. It became a center of political tensions following the postwar amendments that gave freedmen civil rights under the US constitution. Whites conducted an insurgency to maintain white supremacy, particularly through paramilitary groups known as the Red Shirts. They used violence and intimidation during election seasons from 1872 on to disrupt and suppress black Republican voting.

In May 1876, six black suspects were lynched by a white mob for the alleged murders of a white couple. In the Hamburg Massacre of July 8, 1876, several black militia were killed by whites, part of a large group of more than 100 armed men who attended a court hearing of a complaint of whites against the militia. Some of the white men came from Augusta. Due to fraud, more Democratic votes were recorded in Edgefield County than there were total residents; similar fraud occurred elsewhere, as did suppression of black voting. Eventually the election was decided in Hampton's favor, and the Democrats also took control of the state legislature. As a result of a national compromise, Federal troops were withdrawn in 1877 from South Carolina and other southern states, ending Reconstruction.

The long decline in population from 1910 to 1980 reflects the decline in agriculture, mechanization reducing labor needs, and the effect of many African Americans leaving for Northern and Midwestern cities in the Great Migration out of the rural South.

Geography

National protected area
 Sumter National Forest (part)

State and local protected area 
 Steven's Creek Heritage Preserve (part)

Major water bodies 
 Savannah River
 Steven Creek

Adjacent counties 
 Saluda County – northeast
 Aiken County – east
 Richmond County, Georgia – southwest
 Columbia County, Georgia – southwest
 McCormick County – west
 Greenwood County – northwest

Major highways

Major infrastructure 
 Edgefield County Airport (6J6)

Demographics

2020 census

As of the 2020 United States census, there were 25,657 people, 9,176 households, and 6,471 families residing in the county.

2010 census
As of the 2010 United States Census, there were 55,285 people, 21,348 households, and 16,706 families living in the county. The racial makeup of the county was 58.6% white, 37.2% black or African American, 0.4% Asian, 0.2% American Indian or Alaska Native, 2.2% from other races, and 1.3% from two or more races. Those of Hispanic or Latino origin (of any race) made up 5.2% of the population. In terms of ancestry, 15.8% were American, 9.0% were English, 6.7% were Irish, and 5.1% were German.

Of the 9,348 households, 33.3% had children under the age of 18 living with them, 50.9% were married couples living together, 16.0% had a female householder with no husband present, 28.3% were non-families, and 24.9% of all households were made up of individuals. The average household size was 2.56 and the average family size was 3.04. The median age was 40.3 years.

The median income for a household in the county was $42,834 and the median income for a family was $57,114. Males had a median income of $41,759 versus $29,660 for females. The per capita income for the county was $19,901. About 17.8% of families and 21.2% of the population were below the poverty line, including 33.1% of those under age 18 and 17.1% of those age 65 or over.

2000 census
As of the census of 2000, there were 24,595 people, 8,270 households, and 6,210 families living in the county. There were 9,223 housing units at an average density of 18 per square mile (7/km2). The racial makeup of the county was 56.77% White, 41.51% Black or African American, 0.33% Native American, 0.24% Asian, 0.03% Pacific Islander, 0.44% from other races, and 0.69% from two or more races.  2.05% of the population were Hispanic or Latino of any race.

There were 8,270 households, out of which 34.80% had children under the age of 18 living with them, 55.60% were married couples living together, 15.50% had a female householder with no husband present, and 24.90% were non-families. 22.40% of all households were made up of individuals, and 9.10% had someone living alone who was 65 years of age or older.  The average household size was 2.66 and the average family size was 3.12.

In the county, the population was spread out, with 24.10% under the age of 18, 9.80% from 18 to 24, 32.10% from 25 to 44, 23.20% from 45 to 64, and 10.90% who were 65 years of age or older.  The median age was 36 years. For every 100 females, there were 112.80 males.  For every 100 females age 18 and over, there were 114.80 males.

The median income for a household in the county was $35,146, and the median income for a family was $41,810. Males had a median income of $32,748 versus $23,331 for females. The per capita income for the county was $15,415.  About 13.00% of families and 15.50% of the population were below the poverty line, including 19.60% of those under age 18 and 18.40% of those age 65 or over.

Government and politics
The Federal Bureau of Prisons Federal Correctional Institution, Edgefield is in the county; it is partially within the city limits of Edgefield, and partially in an unincorporated area.

Media
Edgefield has one newspaper, published in the town of the same name:
 Edgefield Advertiser, the oldest newspaper in S.C.

The local radio station is located in the town of Johnston:
 WLFW

Edgefield is also served by the following television stations:
 WRDW-TV News 12, Augusta, Georgia
 WJBF NewsChannel 6, Augusta, Georgia
 WAGT NBC Augusta 26, Augusta, Georgia
 WFXG FOX-54, Augusta, Georgia

Communities

City
 North Augusta (mostly in Aiken County)

Towns
 Edgefield (county seat and largest town)
 Johnston
 Trenton

Census-designated place
 Murphys Estates

Notable people

Governors
 Andrew Pickens, II 1816–1818
 George McDuffie 1834–1836
 Pierce Mason Butler 1836–1838
 James H. Hammond 1842–1844
 Francis W. Pickens 1860–1862
 Milledge L. Bonham 1862–1864
 John C. Sheppard 1886
 Benjamin R. Tillman 1890–1894
 John Gary Evans 1894–1897
 Strom Thurmond 1947–1951

Other notable people
In addition to its ten governors of South Carolina listed below, Edgefield County was the home of numerous local notables: George Galphin (1709–1780);Samuel Hammond (1757–1842); Parson Mason Locke Weems (1759–1825); Rebecca "Becky" Cotton (1765–1807); Billy Porter (aka “Billy the Fiddler”), a slave (1771–1821); Rev. William Bullein Johnson (1782–1862); Augustus Baldwin Longstreet (1790–1870), a famous author; Andrew Pickens Butler (1796–1857); Dave Drake (1800–1879?), a slave; Francis Hugh Wardlaw (1800–1861); Louis T. Wigfall (1816–1874); Preston S. Brooks (1819–1857); General James A. Longstreet (1821–1904), a leading Confederate general; Prince Rivers (1823–1887), a black leader; George D. Tillman (1826–1901); Martin Witherspoon Gary (1831–1881); Lucy Holcombe Pickens (1832–1899); Matthew Calbraith Butler (1836–1909); Alexander Bettis (1836–1895), a black leader; Lawrence Cain (1845–1884), a black leader; Paris Simkins (1849–1930), a black leader; Daniel Augustus Tompkins (1851–1914); Alfred W. Nicholson (1861–1945), a black leader; John William Thurmond (1862–1934); Emma Anderson Dunovant (1866–1956); Florence Adams Mims (1873–1951); Benjamin Mays (1894–1984), a black leader; and Francis Butler Simkins (1897–1966), a historian.

See also
 List of counties in South Carolina
 National Register of Historic Places listings in Edgefield County, South Carolina
 List of national forests of the United States

References

Further reading
 Burton, Vernon. "Race and Reconstruction: Edgefield County, South Carolina." Journal of Social History (1978) 12#1: 31–56 online.
 Burton, Orville Vernon. In my Father's house are many mansions: Family and community in Edgefield, South Carolina (Univ of North Carolina Press, 2000) excerpt.
 Chapman, John A. History of Edgefield County: From the Earliest Settlements to 1897 (Newberry, South Carolina: Elbert H. Aull, Publisher and Printer, 1897). online
 Ford, Lacy K. "Origins of the Edgefield Tradition: The Late Antebellum Experience and the Roots of Political Insurgency." South Carolina Historical Magazine 98.4 (1997): 328–348.
 Russell, Thomas D. "The Antebellum Courthouse as Creditors' Domain: Trial-Court Activity in South Carolina and the Concomitance of Lending and Litigation." American Journal of Legal History 40 (1996): 331+.
 Steen, Carl, and Corbett E. Toussaint. "Who Were the Potters in the Old Edgefield District?." Journal of African Diaspora Archaeology and Heritage 6.2 (2017): 78–109.

External links

 
 
 Edgefield County Chamber of Commerce
 Edgefield County History and Images

 
1785 establishments in South Carolina
Augusta metropolitan area
Populated places established in 1785